The 2011–12 Primera División season is the 93rd of Costa Rica's top-flight professional football league. The season was divided into two championships: the Invierno and the Verano. The season began on 31 July 2011.

Promotion and relegation 
Universidad de Costa Rica finished last season in last place in the overall table at the end of last season and were relegated to the Segunda División. Replacing them in the league for this season are the overall champions of last season's Segunda División competition, Belén Siglo XXI.

Barrio México were expelled from last year's competition during the 2011 Verano tournament and were eventually relegated from the league due to various financial difficulties. They were not replaced for this season.

For this season, Brujas changed their name to Orión FC Desamparados.

Format changes 
Due to the reduction of the league to 11 teams for this season, the league's format was changed for this season. There would be no groups this season. Instead, for both tournaments, the clubs would play every other club twice, once at home and once away, for a total of 20 matches each. At the end of the regular season, the top 4 teams in the league standings would participate in the playoffs. At the end of the season, the last place club would participate in a promotion-relegation playoff against the Segunda División overall runners-up, while the Segunda División overall champions would be promoted to next season's competition automatically.

Average attendance
Saprissa 14,990
Alajuelense 9,720
Herediano 4,064
Limón 3,220
Cartaginés 3,090
Santos de Guápiles 2,058
San Carlos 2,109
Puntarenas 2,027
Pérez Zeledón 1,119
Belén 1,117
Orión 544

Team information

Campeonato de Invierno 
The 2011 Campeonato de Invierno, officially the 2011 Campeonato de Invierno Scotiabank for sponsorship reasons, was the first tournament of the season. The tournament began on 31 July 2011 and ended on 18 December 2011.

First stage

Standings

Results

Second stage

Semifinals

First legs

Second legs

Finals

First leg

Second leg

2–2 on aggregate score, Alajuelense wins on penalties 6–5

Top goalscorers

Campeonato de Verano 
The 2012 Campeonato de Verano began on 15 January 2012 and ended in May 2012.

First stage

Standings

Results

Second stage

Semifinals

First legs

Second legs

Finals

First leg

Second leg

Aggregate table

References

External links
 UNAFUT's official website 

Liga FPD seasons
1
Costa